The Potez 32 and its military version the Potez 33 was a single-engine French monoplane transport built by Potez and based on the Potez 29 biplane.

Development
The Potez 32 used the same fuselage, tail unit and landing gear of the Potez 29, but was a high-wing strut-braced monoplane configured as either a five-passenger transport or mail plane. The first aircraft was flown in 1928 and was followed by 54 production aircraft.

The Potez 33 militarized version was first flown in 1928 and designed as a liaison / observation aircraft or could be used as a pilot or observer trainer. The Potez 33 was fitted with dual controls and had large observation windows, it also had a dorsal machine gun position and could carry light bombs on under-fuselage racks.

Variants

Potez 32
Civil variant powered by a Salmson 9Ab engine, prototype and 31 production aircraft.
Potez 32/2
Civil variant powered by a 171 kW (230 hp) Lorraine 7Ma engine, one built.
Potez 32/3
Civil export variant for Canada with a 164 kW (220 hp) Wright J-5 radial engine, seven built.
Potez 32/4
Civil variant powered by a 283 kW (380 hp) Gnome-Rhône 9A and a small increase in wing area, nine built and five converted for Potez 32.
Potez 32/5
Experimental variant with a Hispano-Suiza 9Qd engine, one built.
Potez 33/1
Military variant with a 171 kW (230 hp) Lorraine 7Me, two built for Portugal.
Potez 33/2
Military production variant with a Salmson 9Ab, 40 built for Brazilian and French Air Forces.
Potez 33/3
Military variant for Belgium with a 224 kW (300 hp) Gnome-Rhône 7Kdrs radial, four built.
Potez 33/4
Military variant for Belgium with a 224 kW (300 hp) Lorraine Algol 9Na, eight built.

Operators

Potez 32 civil operators

Aéropostale
Air Orient
CIDNA

Potez 33 military operators

Belgian Air Force

Brazilian Air Force

French Air Force

Portuguese Air Force

Specifications (Potez 33/2)

References

Further reading
 

1920s French civil utility aircraft
032
High-wing aircraft
Aircraft first flown in 1928
Single-engined tractor aircraft